In mathematics, the Lagrangian theory on fiber bundles is globally formulated in algebraic terms of the variational bicomplex, without appealing to the calculus of variations. For instance, this is the case of  classical field theory on fiber bundles (covariant classical field theory).

The variational bicomplex is a cochain complex of the differential graded algebra of exterior forms on jet manifolds of sections of a fiber bundle. Lagrangians and Euler–Lagrange operators on a fiber bundle are defined as elements of this bicomplex. Cohomology of the variational bicomplex leads to the global first variational formula and first Noether's theorem.

Extended to Lagrangian theory of even and odd fields on graded manifolds, the variational bicomplex provides strict mathematical formulation of classical field theory in a general case of reducible degenerate Lagrangians and the Lagrangian BRST theory.

See also 

Calculus of variations
Lagrangian system
Jet bundle

References 

 
 Anderson, I., "Introduction to variational bicomplex", Contemp. Math. 132 (1992) 51.
 Barnich, G., Brandt, F., Henneaux, M., "Local BRST cohomology", Phys. Rep. 338 (2000) 439.
 Giachetta, G., Mangiarotti, L., Sardanashvily, G., Advanced Classical Field Theory, World Scientific, 2009, .

External links 
 Dragon, N., BRS symmetry and cohomology,  
 Sardanashvily, G., Graded infinite-order jet manifolds, Int. G. Geom. Methods Mod. Phys. 4 (2007) 1335; 

Calculus of variations
Differential equations
Differential geometry